"Hypest Hype" is a song by electronic music duo Chase & Status. It was released on 8 November 2010 as a promotional single for their second studio album No More Idols, which was released on 28 January 2011. It also serves as the third overall single released from the album. The song features vocals from English grime MC Tempa T.

Background and release
"Hypest Hype" received radio support after the release of "Let You Go" (reaching BBC Radio 1's A-List) implying it would be the third single. Instead, the song was released as a free download through their official website. However, it did chart at number 70 on the UK Singles Chart and number seven in the UK Dance Chart after the release of the album. On 21 November 2010, Q magazine dubbed the song as their "Track of the Day".

Track listing

Personnel
 Saul Milton, Will Kennard – producer, mixing, writing, all instruments
 Nicholas "Tempa T" Dei – writing, lead vocals
 Andy Gangadeen – drums
 Takura Tendayi – backing vocals
 Jim Morrison, Robby Krieger, Ray Manzarek and John Densmore – writing

Chart performance

Release history

References

2010 songs
Chase & Status songs
Songs written by Will Kennard
Songs written by Saul Milton
Songs written by Ray Manzarek
Songs written by Jim Morrison
Songs written by Robby Krieger
Songs written by John Densmore
2010 singles